His Majesty's Marshal of the Diplomatic Corps is a senior member of the Royal Household of the Sovereign of the United Kingdom. He is the King's link with the diplomatic community in London, arranges the annual diplomatic corps reception by the Sovereign, organises the regular presentation of credentials ceremonies for ambassadors and high commissioners, as well as supervises attendance of diplomats at state events. Marshals generally hold office for ten-year terms and were formerly retired senior military officers, though the last three marshals have been diplomats. The marshal is assisted by the Vice-Marshal of the Diplomatic Corps, the First Assistant Marshal, and other assistant marshals.

The office was created as recently as 1920 to replace the former Master of the Ceremonies, an office dating from c.1620. Before 1920, the Vice-Marshal was known as the Marshal of the Ceremonies. The Marshal of the Diplomatic Corps wears a distinctive two-sided 17th-century badge of office, hung from gold chains (which was previously worn by the Master of Ceremonies): in times of peace the picture seen is an olive branch, together with the motto Beati Pacifici (the personal motto of James I); in times of war the medal is reversed, to show the image of a brandished sword and the motto Dieu et mon droit.

The Marshal of the Diplomatic Corps is, along with the King's Equerry, expected to walk backwards discreetly when leaving the presence of the monarch. They are the only two visitors who are expected to do this today, as the ancient tradition that all who had the honour of a meeting with the monarch were expected to walk discreetly backwards when leaving the Sovereign's presence has been dropped for health and safety reasons. These two senior members of the Royal Household are expected to walk backwards leaving the room when they have either been summoned to see the King personally or they are introducing others – such as senior foreign diplomats – for audiences with the King.

List of Marshals of the Diplomatic Corps
 1920–1934: Major-General Sir John Hanbury-Williams  
 1934–1945: Lieutenant-General Sir Sidney Clive  
 1945–1950: Sir John Monck  
 1950–1961: Major-General Sir Guy Salisbury-Jones  
 1962–1971: Rear-Admiral The Rt Hon The Earl Cairns 
 1972–1981: Major-General Lord Michael Fitzalan-Howard  
 1982–1991: Lieutenant-General Sir John Richards , Royal Marines 
 1992–2001: Vice-Admiral Sir James Weatherall  
 2001–2008: Sir Anthony Figgis  
 2008–2014: Charles Gray  
 2014–present: Alistair Harrison

List of Vice-Marshals of the Diplomatic Corps
 1936–1945: Sir John Monck  
 1946–1957: Sir Marcus Cheke  
 1957–1965: Captain Dugald Malcolm  
 1965–1972: Sir Lees Mayall  
 1972–1975: Sir John Curle  
 1975–1982: Sir Roger Du Boulay  
 1982–1986: Sir Eustace Gibbs  
 1986–1991: Sir Roger Hervey  
 1991–1996: Sir Anthony Figgis  
 1996–1999: Philip Astley  
 1999–2001: Kathryn Colvin  
 2001–2006: Charles de Chassiron  
 2006–2009: Sarah Gillett  
 2009–2012: Simon Martin 
 2012–2014: Anna Clunes 
 2015: Catherine Nettleton 
 2015–2017: Julian Evans
 2017–2020: Neil Holland
 2020–present: Victoria Busby

References

 
Positions within the British Royal Household
Ceremonial officers in the United Kingdom